In Greek mythology, Eurybates (Ancient Greek: Εὐρυβάτης) may refer to the same or different  herald(s) for the Greek armies during Trojan War:

 Eurybates, from Ithaca,  served as Odysseus's squire and herald. He was described by Odysseus to Penelope as "round-shouldered, dark-skinned, and curly-haired". Odysseus is said to pay him greater regard than any other of his companions for his honesty and faithfulness.
 Eurybates, a herald who was sent, along with Talthybius, by Agamemnon to retrieve Briseis from Achilles' camp in Iliad, I, but he might be a different person from Odysseus's herald mentioned in Iliad, 2 ("Eurybates of Ithaca"), and in the Odyssey.

Notes

Reference 

 Homer, The Odyssey with an English Translation by A.T. Murray, PH.D. in two volumes. Cambridge, MA., Harvard University Press; London, William Heinemann, Ltd. 1919. Online version at the Perseus Digital Library. Greek text available from the same website.

Achaeans (Homer)

People of the Trojan War